Ahmed Toufiq Hejira or Hjira ( – born 1959, Oujda) is a Moroccan politician of the Istiqlal party. Between 2007 and 2012, he held the position of Minister of Housing and Urbanism in the cabinet of Abbas El Fassi. He holds a bachelor in economics from the University of Mohammed V.

See also
Cabinet of Morocco

References

Living people
Government ministers of Morocco
Mohammed V University alumni
1959 births
People from Oujda
Istiqlal Party politicians